Alberto José Callaspo Brito (born April 19, 1983) is a Venezuelan professional baseball infielder. He has played in Major League Baseball (MLB) for the Arizona Diamondbacks, Kansas City Royals, Los Angeles Angels of Anaheim, Oakland Athletics, Atlanta Braves and Los Angeles Dodgers. Callaspo has primarily played third base and second base during his career.

Career

Anaheim/Los Angeles Angels
Callaspo was originally signed by the then-Anaheim Angels in 2001, playing for the Aguilas Cibaeñas of Dominican Summer League. In 2002, Callaspo batted .338 with 16 doubles, 10 triples, three home runs and 60 RBI in 70 games with the rookie-level Provo Angels, where he was voted by Baseball America as a Pioneer League All-Star and was named to Pioneer League All-Star team.

In 2003, Callaspo led the Midwest League with a .327 average and 38 doubles with the Cedar Rapids Kernels. Callaspo spent 2004 with the Double-A Arkansas Travelers, where he was selected for the Texas League All-Star game. Callaspo split 2005 with the Travelers and Triple-A Salt Lake Stingers. He again made the Texas League All-Star Game and was named to the Texas League Post-Season All-Star Team.

Arizona Diamondbacks
On March 1, 2006, the Angels traded Callaspo to the Arizona Diamondbacks in exchange for pitcher Jason Bulger. He began 2006 with the Triple-A Tucson Sidewinders.  He was named the Diamondbacks' Minor League Player of the Year. Callaspo was called up to the Diamondbacks.  He also split the 2007 season between Arizona and Tucson.

Kansas City Royals
On December 14, 2007, the Diamondbacks traded Callaspo to the Kansas City Royals in exchange for pitcher Billy Buckner. He split the 2008 season between the big-league club and Triple-A Omaha Royals.

In 2009, Callaspo tied for the major league lead in errors by a second baseman, with 17, and had the lowest fielding percentage of any starting second baseman (.973).

Los Angeles Angels of Anaheim
On July 22, 2010, Callaspo was traded to the Los Angeles Angels of Anaheim in exchange for pitchers Sean O'Sullivan and Will Smith.

On January 16, 2012, Callaspo signed a one-year deal with the Angels worth $3.15 million, thus avoiding arbitration. On February 5, 2013, the Angels finalized a two-year deal with Callaspo worth $8.975 million.

Oakland Athletics
On July 30, 2013 he was traded to the Oakland Athletics in exchange for Grant Green

Atlanta Braves
On December 9, 2014, Callaspo agreed to a one-year, $3 million contract with the Atlanta Braves.

Los Angeles Dodgers
On May 27, 2015, he was traded to the Los Angeles Dodgers (with Ian Thomas, Eric Stults and Juan Jaime) in exchange for Juan Uribe and Chris Withrow. In 59 games for the Dodgers, he hit .262. The Dodgers designated him for assignment on August 19 and he was released on August 27.

Bridgeport Bluefish
On March 28, 2017, Callaspo signed with the Bridgeport Bluefish of the Atlantic League of Professional Baseball.

Vaqueros Unión Laguna
On May 30, 2017, Callaspo signed with the Vaqueros Unión Laguna of the Mexican Baseball League.

Leones de Yucatán
On March 1, 2018, Callaspo was traded to the Leones de Yucatán of the Mexican Baseball League in exchange for former MLB player Yuniesky Betancourt.

Algodoneros de Unión Laguna
On May 1, 2018, Callaspo was traded to the Algodoneros de Unión Laguna of the Mexican Baseball League. He was released on June 4, 2018.

West Virginia Power/Charleston Dirty Birds
On December 7, 2020, Callaspo signed with the Welland Jackfish of the Intercounty Baseball League (IBL). Before the start of the season, on May 28, 2021, Callaspo signed with the West Virginia Power of the Atlantic League of Professional Baseball. Callaspo slashed .335/.469/.461 with 6 home runs and 57 RBI in 99 games for the Power. He became a free agent following the season. On March 4, 2022, Callaspo re-signed with the team, now named the Charleston Dirty Birds. He was released by the team on May 19, 2022.

Personal life
Callaspo was arrested at his home on May 10, 2007, by Phoenix police for domestic violence, but the charges against him were later dropped. He was placed on the restricted list without pay the day after the arrest, but the Major League Baseball Players Association filed a grievance on his behalf and he was reinstated within a week.

In 2011, Mariangely Santana Pérez sued Callaspo, claiming he was the father of her son. The Orange County Superior Court later determined that Callaspo was not the biological father.

See also
 List of players from Venezuela in Major League Baseball

References

External links

1983 births
Living people
Águilas del Zulia players
Algodoneros de Unión Laguna players
Arizona Diamondbacks players
Arkansas Travelers players
Atlanta Braves players
Bridgeport Bluefish players
Caribes de Oriente players
Cedar Rapids Kernels players
Inland Empire 66ers of San Bernardino players
Kansas City Royals players
Los Angeles Angels players
Los Angeles Dodgers players
Major League Baseball players from Venezuela
Major League Baseball second basemen
Major League Baseball third basemen
Mexican League baseball second basemen
Mexican League baseball third basemen
Navegantes del Magallanes players
Oakland Athletics players
Omaha Royals players
Sportspeople from Maracay
Provo Angels players
Salt Lake Stingers players
Stockton Ports players
Tigres de Aragua players
Tucson Sidewinders players
Vaqueros Unión Laguna players
Venezuelan expatriate baseball players in Mexico
Venezuelan expatriate baseball players in the United States
West Virginia Power players
Venezuelan expatriate baseball players in Colombia